The 1973 AFC Youth Championship was held in Tehran, Iran.

Venues

Group stage

Group A

Group B

Group C

Group D

Quarterfinals

Semifinals

Third place match

Final

References

External links
Results by RSSSF
Malaysia U19 Vs Iran U19 (1973 AFC Youth Championship)

AFC U-19 Championship
AFC Youth Championship
Sport in Tehran
AFC Youth Championship
AFC Youth Championship
International association football competitions hosted by Iran
AFC Youth Championship